East Moline is a city in Rock Island County, Illinois, United States. The population was 21,374 at the 2020 census. East Moline is part of the Quad Cities, along with the cities of Rock Island, Moline, and the Iowa cities of Davenport and Bettendorf. As of 2011, the Quad Cities has a population estimate of 381,342.

Geography

East Moline is located at  (41.511940, −90.435203).

Demographics

2020 census

Note: the US Census treats Hispanic/Latino as an ethnic category. This table excludes Latinos from the racial categories and assigns them to a separate category. Hispanics/Latinos can be of any race

As of the United States Census taken in 2000, there were 20,333 people, 8,510 households, and 5,369 families living in the city. The racial makeup of the city was 80.04% White, 7.34% African American, 0.35% Native American, 2.25% Asian, 7.47% from other races, and 2.54% from two or more races. Hispanic or Latino of any race were 15.15% of the population.

Of the 8,510 households 29.5% had children under the age of 18 living with them, 45.1% were married couples living together, 13.9% had a female householder with no husband present, and 36.9% were non-families. 32.1% of households were one person and 14.4% were one person aged 65 or older. The average household size was 2.35 and the average family size was 2.97.

The age distribution was 24.7% under the age of 18, 9.4% from 18 to 24, 26.5% from 25 to 44, 22.4% from 45 to 64, and 17.0% 65 or older. The median age was 37 years. For every 100 females, there were 91.4 males. For every 100 females age 18 and over, there were 85.9 males.

The median income for a household in the city was $35,836, and the median family income  was $44,695. Males had a median income of $35,263 versus $23,607 for females. The per capita income for the city was $18,245. About 11.6% of families and 13.9% of the population were below the poverty line, including 20.3% of those under age 18 and 7.0% of those age 65 or over.

Economy

Top employers
According to the City's 2021 Annual Comprehensive Financial Report, the top employers in the city are:

Education

Elementary schools
Hillcrest Elementary
Ridgewood Elementary
Wells Elementary
Bowlesburg Elementary

Middle schools
 Glenview Middle School

High schools
 United Township High School

Special Education schools
 Black Hawk Area Special Education District (BHASED)

Notable people         
Mike Butcher, MLB pitcher, pitching coach.
Charles F. Carpentier, businessman and politician, lived in East Moline. He served as mayor of East Moline, and also served as Illinois Secretary of State
Max Hodge, Television writer.
Spike O'Dell, radio talk show host who left the Quad Cities for Chicago in 1987. He went on to gain fame on WGN. 'Spike' attended McKinley Elementary, Glenview junior, and United Township highschool.
Laurdine Patrick, jazz musician, father of Massachusetts governor Deval Patrick, was born in East Moline.

References

External links
 City of East Moline
 East Moline School District

 
East Moline
Cities in Illinois
Cities in Rock Island County, Illinois
Cities in the Quad Cities
Populated places established in 1903
Illinois populated places on the Mississippi River
1903 establishments in Illinois